Running on the Sun: The Badwater 135 is a 2000 documentary film directed by Mel Stuart. The film follows athletes as they run 135 miles in the 1999 Badwater Ultramarathon, starting in California's Death Valley and ending at Whitney Portal, the trailhead to Mount Whitney.

The winner for the 1999 race was Eric Clifton with a time of 27 hours and 49 minutes, beating the previous year winner, Gabriel Flores.

References

External links

2000 documentary films
2000 films
American sports documentary films
Documentary films about sportspeople
Ultramarathons in California
2000s English-language films
2000s American films